To Bina Mo Kahani Adha is a 2007 Oriya film   directed by Sanjay Nayak   starring Anubhav Mohanty, Archita Sahu, and Jairam Samal.

Plot
Arun is a rich young man. He goes to a village to see a girl because his parents wanted to conduct his marriage with that girl. But in the village, Arun is arrested by the girl and is sent to jail. Arun returns from jail to tries to impress the girl, and even manages to finally tie the knot. However, on the fourth night, he confesses that he had merely resorted to manipulation so as to seek revenge on her. Eventually, director Sanjay Nayak grants the movie a happy ending.

Cast
Anubhav Mohanty	... 	Amar
Archita Sahu
Jairam Samal	
Arabinda		
Biju Badajena		
Ajit Das		
Anita Das		
Debjani		
Jeena	Samal	
Chakradhar Jena		
Raimohan		
Jairam Samal

Music
The music of the film composed  by Santiraj Khosla.
The tracks from the film include:

References

External links 
 

2007 films
2000s Odia-language films